Shane Salerno (born November 27, 1972) is an American screenwriter, producer, and Chief Creative Officer of The Story Factory. His writing credits include the films Avatar: The Way of Water, Armageddon, Savages, Shaft, and the TV series Hawaii Five-0. He was chosen by director James Cameron to co-write the four sequels to Avatar, Avatar: The Way of Water (released in 2022), Avatar: The Seed Bearer (2024), Avatar: The Tulkun Rider (2026), and Avatar: The Quest for Eywa (2028). He spent ten years writing, producing, financing, and directing the documentary Salinger, and co-writing with David Shields the companion book which became a New York Times bestseller.

As a screenwriter, Salerno has collaborated with James Cameron, Steven Spielberg, Michael Mann, Michael Bay, William Friedkin, Oliver Stone, Ron Howard, John Singleton, Jan de Bont, and Ridley Scott, He has sold pitches, spec screenplays, fiction and non-fiction books, feature film documentaries, television pilots, television documentaries, and foreign book deals reaching eight figures. All-told, films he has either written or co-written have resulted in six movies premiering at number one at the box office, and have grossed over three billion dollars (not including the upcoming Avatar: The Seed Bearer, Avatar: The Tulkun Rider, and Avatar: The Quest for Eywa).

Salerno is also the founder and Chief Creative Officer of The Story Factory, a production company and literary agency for novelists, which produces films and TV series based on literary properties, including the Showtime miniseries The Comey Rule in 2020, for which Jeff Daniels and Brendan Gleeson were both nominated for Golden Globes. Through his company The Story Factory, Salerno has been principally involved in the creation and publication of some of the most critically acclaimed books of the last decade, including 24 books that hit 47 different New York Times bestseller lists (with six books hitting #1 on ten lists), six New York Times Critics’ Choice Selections for Best Book of the Year with additional Best of the Year selections by more than 200 publications around the world, as well as multiple literary awards and nominations. The Story Factory's most recent book, Heat 2, written by four-time Academy Award nominee Michael Mann and Edgar winner Meg Gardiner debuted at #1 on the New York Times bestseller list.

Surrounding the 2020 presidential election, Salerno partnered with Don Winslow to champion Democratic candidates and causes and to fight back against Donald Trump and his agenda. Together they launched Don Winslow Films and began creating their own political videos for social media, highlighting the corruption of Trump and his administration. On October 13, 2020, Don Winslow Films released a video critical of Trump prior to his campaign event in Pennsylvania. The video features Bruce Springsteen's song "Streets of Philadelphia" and has been viewed more than 10 million times. According to a January 4, 2021 Los Angeles Times article, Don Winslow Films videos had garnered over 135 million views at that time. As of April 2022, the total is now over 250 million views.

Early life and education
Shane Salerno was born in Memphis, Tennessee in 1972. He attended 10 schools in 12 years, including St. John's College High School, a military academy in Washington, D.C. where he was co-captain of the football team and the only write-in class president since the school was founded in 1851. At San Dieguito High School in Encinitas, California, he was editor of the school newspaper, played varsity football, and was voted most likely to succeed.

Salerno has repeatedly cited the influence of filmmaker Michael Mann and the TV show Miami Vice, which Mann created and produced. His first formative cinematic memory from childhood was watching Mann's movie Thief when he was eight years old. He wrote two films for Mann in 2000 and 2012 and dedicated his documentary film Salinger to him in 2013. As a literary agent, Salerno now currently represents Michael Mann Books, Mann's publishing imprint at HarperCollins.

Teenage filmmaker 
Salerno first made national headlines as a high school senior when he wrote, produced and directed the award-winning documentary film Sundown: The Future of Children and Drugs. The film had its world premiere on Larry King Live in September 1991. Larry King ended the interview by saying "And Shane Salerno, one has a feeling we are going to be hearing about you. I have this feeling." Sundown won several "Best Documentary of the Year" honors and Salerno was honored in separate ceremonies in houses of the United States Congress.

TV and film
At the age of 19, Salerno was invited by Gregory Hoblit, a nine-time Emmy winning producer/director, to apprentice as a writer/director on NYPD Blue. In an interview with Creative Screenwriting, Salerno credited the backstage pass as his "film school". At 22, Salerno signed a three-year contract with Universal Television to work on various series beginning with New York Undercover. His television scripts led film producers to offer him the opportunity to write feature films. As a result of these offers, Salerno asked Universal to release him from his contract.

Salerno's first feature screenplay was the World War II submarine thriller Thunder Below for Steven Spielberg and DreamWorks Pictures based on the book by Congressional Medal of Honor recipient Eugene B. Fluckey. Salerno has called this time with Steven Spielberg his "writing school".

Salerno was then hired to do a production rewrite of the Kurt Russell film Breakdown, directed by Jonathan Mostow. Breakdown debuted #1 at the box office with $12.3 million. The film grossed a total of $50,159,144 in the United States and Canada. Rotten Tomatoes reported that 73% of critics gave the film positive reviews. Peter Stack of the San Francisco Chronicle praised the film, saying, "Breakdown use[s] old-fashioned ingenuity – plus a compelling star, a fast-paced mystery and a deadpan villain – to come up with a sizzler." Roger Ebert gave the film a positive review, calling it "taut, skillful and surgically effective".

In 1997, director Michael Bay asked him to rewrite the screenplay for Armageddon. The film was released on July 1, 1998, in 3,127 theaters in the United States and Canada. It ranked first at the box office with an opening weekend gross of $36 million. It grossed $201.6 million in the United States and Canada and $352.1 million in other territories for a worldwide total of $553.7 million. It was the highest-grossing film of 1998, both worldwide and in the United States. The film received four Academy Award nominations at the 71st Academy Awards and also received the Saturn Award for Best Direction and Best Science Fiction Film (where it tied with Dark City). In the book Visions of Armageddon, Bay called Salerno's work "brilliant." Following the film, Salerno was named by Variety as one of the "hottest new creatives on the film scene."

In 1998, working with director John Singleton and writer Richard Price, Salerno wrote the screenplay for the 2000 movie Shaft. It began Salerno's lifelong friendship with the director and when Singleton passed in 2019, Salerno wrote a tribute to Singleton in Deadline Hollywood. The film opened at #1 with $21.7 million; by the end of its run, Shaft had grossed $70.3 million in the domestic box office and $107.2 million worldwide, against a $46 million budget.

In 1999, Salerno sold the rights to the bestseller Zodiac to Disney's Touchstone Pictures in a seven-figure deal. Despite Salerno delivering a well-regarded screenplay, Disney was unwilling to greenlight a violent film about a serial killer. When Disney let the rights lapse, David Fincher directed Zodiac based on the same book for another studio.

In February 2000, acclaimed filmmaker Michael Mann announced his next project after Ali would likely be a "fact-based film about the drug trade in the U.S. and Mexico," written by Salerno.

In 2001–2002, Salerno returned to television by co-creating (with crime novelist Don Winslow) the NBC series UC: Undercover, which TV Guide described as "Donnie Brasco meets Mission Impossible." The series starred Vera Farmiga, Oded Fehr, Jon Seda and Ving Rhames. Salerno served as executive producer, showrunner, head writer, and music supervisor. The New York Times called it a "fast paced, good-looking series," and Variety wrote that series lead Oded Fehr is a "commanding and interesting addition to television." Variety added that "technical credits are comparable to theatrical quality," which led the series winning awards for acting, cinematography and sound. Despite the favorable reviews, the series lasted just one season. But Salerno's friendship with Winslow would last, and the two would partner again in the future, with Salerno eventually becoming Winslow's book agent.

In 2003, working with director Paul W. S. Anderson, Salerno adapted the screenplay for Alien vs. Predator. Salerno spent six months writing the shooting script, finished its development, and stayed on for revisions throughout the film's production. Alien vs. Predator grossed $38.2 million in its opening weekend and debuted at #1 at the box office. It would gross another $97.1 million internationally, making it the second highest-grossing film in either the Alien or Predator franchises (behind only Prometheus). Salerno would go on to write the screenplay for the sequel Aliens vs. Predator: Requiem.

In 2004, Salerno became the youngest "Guest of Honor" speaker in the history of the Los Angeles Screenwriting Expo. He made follow up appearances in 2005 and 2006. When interviewed for Expo 5, Creative Screenwriting Magazine publisher Erik Bauer remarked that "Shane Salerno has been really supportive over the years, and is a great mentor for a number of writers that I know."

In 2005, Salerno was brought on to adapt Meg, the Steve Alten novel, with Jan de Bont directing. The project had originally been set up at Disney, but languished in development. New Line then optioned the book, where it was developed for two and a half years. New Line's original script was written by Alten, but the studio feared it too closely resembled Jurassic Park and they brought in Salerno to do a rewrite. (Salerno turned in a script that was more serious in tone than the version of the film that would eventually be released in 2018.) de Bont hired his dream team of special effects and production experts, and New Line even pre-sold the rights to foreign distributors. But when budgeted out, the film was estimated to cost north of $150 million. Salerno and de Bont worked to bring the budget down under $125 million, but in the end New Line got cold feet and let the option expire.

In 2006, Salerno was brought on board to do a production draft of the Nicolas Cage vehicle Ghost Rider. Released in 2007, the film went on to gross almost $230 million.

On Monday, June 29, 2009, Variety carried a front-page story about Salerno selling License to Steal, a pitch for "seven figures upfront" to Paramount Pictures and Kurtzman-Orci Productions (Star Trek, Transformers). Variety described the project as "Butch Cassidy and the Sundance Kid set in the world of hi-line repo." Several studios and A-list directors pursued Salerno. According to Variety, Salerno made the pitch four times. He accompanied Bryan Singer (X-Men, The Usual Suspects) to Sony, McG (Terminator: Salvation) to Warner Brothers and Timor Bekmambetov (Wanted) to Universal before deciding on Paramount Pictures and Kurtzman-Orci in a deal Variety said was "...the priciest project deal of the summer." After the sale, Kurtzman and Orci issued a joint statement: "We're thrilled to be working with Shane, a wildly inventive and talented creator."

On December 10, 2009, MTV broke the story that the "secret James Cameron/Shane Salerno project" is a remake of the 1966 Academy Award-winning film Fantastic Voyage. While the film would ultimately not get made, it proved to be an important moment for Salerno, as Cameron later hired Salerno to be one of the co-writers on the upcoming sequels to Avatar, one of the highest-grossing movies of all time.

In 2010, Salerno worked as a writer and consulting producer on the CBS reboot of Hawaii Five-0, which was co-created by Alex Kurtzman, one of the producers on Salerno's previous project, License to Steal. That season, the show was nominated for a Golden Globe and won the People's Choice Award for Favorite New TV Drama.

In 2012, Universal released Savages, based on Don Winslow’s novel. Salerno and Winslow co-wrote the screenplay with writer/director Oliver Stone. The film starred Aaron Taylor-Johnson, Taylor Kitsch, Blake Lively, Benicio del Toro, Salma Hayek, and John Travolta. Roger Ebert gave the film 31/2 stars (out of 4), saying, "A return to form for Stone’s darker side, Savages generates ruthless energy." The film was nominated for four 2012 ALMA Awards, honoring accomplishments made by Hispanics in film, television, and music.

In 2013, Salerno began working as a screenwriter on James Cameron’s much-anticipated sequels to Avatar. Cameron chose Salerno, along with Rick Jaffe, Amanda Silver, and Josh Friedman, to establish a writer’s room for Avatar: The Way of Water, Avatar: The Seed Bearer, Avatar: The Tulkun Rider, and Avatar: The Quest for Eywa. Details of the project are being kept under wraps but Cameron praised Salerno and the other writers, telling Deadline Hollywood they were chosen because he has "long-admired" them.

In 2016, Salerno brokered the seven-figure film rights deal to Don Winslow’s Cartel Trilogy, which will be titled The Border. The trilogy of novels was originally purchased by 20th Century Fox for Salerno to write the script for Ridley Scott to direct. But in 2019, due to the sprawling nature of the story and world therein, FX Networks acquired the rights from their sister studio to turn the novels into a TV series. FX gave the pilot order in December 2022, and production will being in Mexico in 2023.

In 2017, Salerno and Winslow teamed up again to write the cartel-themed narrative for Tom Clancy’s Ghost Recon Wildlands video game for Ubisoft. Wildlands was nominated for IGN's E3 2015 Game of the Show, Best PlayStation 4 Game, Best Xbox One Game and Best PC Game awards, and received one of GameSpot's Best of E3 2015 awards. It was also named the best co-operative and the best shooter by Game Informer in their Best of E3 2015 Awards. Wildlands was the best-selling retail game in both the UK and the US in March 2017, surpassing competitors including Horizon Zero Dawn and The Legend of Zelda: Breath of the Wild. It was also one of the biggest video game launches in 2017, and it became the fastest-selling title in the Tom Clancy's franchise, only behind Tom Clancy's The Division.

In 2018, Salerno was instrumental in selling the film rights to former FBI Director James Comey’s book A Higher Loyalty. Comey was reluctant to have his book adapted into a film or TV series, but credits Salerno with convincing him, telling Comey, "If your book sells a million copies, it’ll be a huge nonfiction success. If a TV show has a million viewers, it’s canceled today." The project – retitled The Comey Rule – eventually landed at Showtime with Salerno and The Story Factory Executive Producing and acclaimed screenwriter Billy Ray (Captain Phillips, Shattered Glass) adapting the book and directing the two-night limited series. Jeff Daniels starred as James Comey and Brendan Gleeson portrayed Donald Trump. Both were nominated for Golden Globes. The two-night special went on to become the highest rated miniseries premiere in the history of Showtime.

Avatar Sequels

Avatar: The Way of Water 
After repeated delays in the expected release schedule, Avatar: The Way of Water premiered in London on December 6, 2022, and was theatrically released in the United States on December 16, 2022. The film received positive reviews from critics, who praised its visual effects and technical achievements but criticized the plot and lengthy runtime. The film was a major box office success, breaking multiple records, and grossing over $2.054 billion worldwide, making it the highest-grossing film of 2022, the highest-grossing film of the COVID-19 pandemic era, the fifth highest-grossing film of all time, the sixth film to pass the $2 billion mark and the second-fastest film to reach the milestone. Organizations like the National Board of Review and the American Film Institute named it as one of the top ten films of 2022. The film was nominated for four awards at the 95th Academy Awards (including Best Picture) and received numerous other accolades.

Film and television credits

Salinger
Salerno spent ten years on his documentary Salinger, a project that he researched, wrote, produced, directed, and financed. The film examined the life of author J. D. Salinger, a writer noted for protecting his privacy. The movie includes interviews with Philip Seymour Hoffman, Edward Norton, John Cusack, and Tom Wolfe. A director's cut appeared on the PBS series American Masters in January 2014.

With author David Shields, Salerno wrote the book Salinger to accompany the film. It reached number six on The New York Times bestseller list and number one on the Los Angeles Times bestseller list. It was also a Barnes & Noble bestseller, an Amazon Best Book of the Month, NPR bestseller, Independent Booksellers bestseller, Book-of-the-Month Club Selection, History Book Club Selection, and earned starred reviews from both Publishers Weekly and Kirkus Reviews.

The Story Factory
Shane Salerno is the founder of The Story Factory, an entertainment company that currently represents authors, including Don Winslow, the Michael Crichton estate, Steve Hamilton, Lou Berney, Meg Gardiner, Marcus Sakey, TJ Newman, John Katzenbach, Adrian McKinty, Reed Farrel Coleman, Bill Beverly, Steve Cavanagh, Dervla McTiernan, Eric Rickstad, James Phelan, and Greg Harden, former US Capitol Police Chief Steven A. Sund, as well as four-time Oscar-nominated  filmmaker Michael Mann.

The Story Factory has put 24 books onto 47 different New York Times Bestseller lists (with six books hitting #1 on ten lists), made over 200 Best Books of the Year lists, and its authors have either won or been nominated for every major writing award in the world, including the Pulitzer Prize, the National Books Critics Circle Award, the Edgar Award, the Barry Award, the Macavity Award, the Los Angeles Times Book Prize, and the New York Times Notable Books of the Year.

Screenwriter and producer Salerno’s foray into literary representation happened during a lunch with his friend and former co-collaborator, Don Winslow. Despite widespread critical accolades, Winslow was lamenting the state of his career and the difficulty of supporting his family on his meager book advances and was contemplating quitting writing and going back to being a safari guide. Salerno told him "a lot of people can be safari guides, not many people can write the way you do." Salerno offered to help negotiate Winslow’s next book deal and Winslow, who figured he was quitting anyway, fired his agent minutes later. Salerno would go on to transform Winslow’s book, film, and TV deals and began accruing seven-figure deals for Winslow’s work. The publishing world took notice and soon other prominent authors began calling Salerno to represent them, as well.

In 2012, Salerno was flipping through novels in a bookstore when he came across Steve Hamilton’s Edgar Award-winning novel The Lock Artist. Salerno optioned the book. This too would prove fruitful, as Salerno and Hamilton struck up a friendship and Hamilton would sign on as the Salerno’s second novelist client. Hamilton’s first book with The Story Factory, The Second Life of Nick Mason, became a New York Times bestseller.

One thing that sets Salerno and The Story Factory apart from other agencies is their collaboration with authors and publishers on the marketing of the novels. The early days of the company saw Salerno pulling double-duty, splitting his time between his screenwriting career and his literary company. He would spend all day working with James Cameron and the other writers on the Avatar sequels, then spend all night working on the deals, marketing, and publicity for his author’s books.

2016 saw Salerno broker a seven-figure book deal for award-winning filmmaker Michael Mann (Heat, The Insider, The Last of the Mohicans) to launch a new book imprint, Michael Mann Books, at HarperCollins. The two had previously worked together on two film projects.

Salerno had heard of Irish author Adrian McKinty’s struggles to sustain his family on his writing advances and, recognizing his immense talent, Salerno called McKinty. But the author thought it was a joke and hung up. Salerno called back, this time with Don Winslow (who saw similarities to his own writing journey), and the two convinced McKinty to sign with The Story Factory. McKinty’s first book with Salerno, The Chain, created a bidding war and the publishing rights were sold in lucrative deal to Mulholland Books. The Chain would go on to become a New York Times bestseller, win the Barry and Macavity awards, and was named Best Book of the Year by International Thriller Writers. Salerno sold the film rights in another seven-figure deal to Universal, with Edgar Wright slated to begin directing the project later in 2022.

In 2019, flight attendant-turned-author TJ Newman sent a query letter to The Story Factory. Salerno happened to pick up the letter on the top of his pile of mail and was intrigued by her concept for a novel about a pilot whose family is kidnapped and will be killed unless he crashes the plane. Salerno signed Newman and eventually sold the publishing rights for seven-figures, then the film rights to Universal in another seven-figure deal.   
 
A full list of the seven-figure book-to-film sales negotiated by The Story Factory includes Don Winslow’s Savages (to Universal, with Oliver Stone directing), Shane Salerno’s Salinger (to PBS for the 200th episode of American Masters, as well as to The Weinstein Company for theatrical release), Steve Hamilton’s The Second Life of Nick Mason (to Lionsgate, with Nina Jacobson and Shane Salerno producing), Winslow’s The Cartel (to Twentieth Century Fox, with Ridley Scott directing and producing), Don Winslow’s The Force (again to Fox, with James Mangold directing a script from Scott Frank, for Matt Damon to star in), Don Winslow’s Satori (to Warner Brothers and Leonardo DiCaprio’s Appian Way, for DiCaprio to star in and produce), Don Winslow’s A Cool Breeze on the Underground (to MRC, for Rian Johnson to executive produce), Meg Gardiner’s UNSUB series to Amazon, Bill Beverly’s Los Angeles Times Book Prize and Gold Dagger-winning novel Dodgers (to FX network), Marcus Sakey’s Afterlife (to Brian Grazer and Ron Howard at Imagine Entertainment), Marcus Sakey’s Brilliance (to Paramount for Will Smith to executive produce and star), Adrian McKinty’s The Chain to Universal (with Edgar Wright directing), TJ Newman’s Falling to Universal, and Adrian McKinty’s upcoming novel The Island to Hulu.

The Story Factory Bestsellers 
The Story Factory has put 24 books onto 47 different New York Times Bestseller lists, with six books hitting #1 on ten lists:

References

External links
 
Filmmakers.com interview

Living people
1972 births
21st-century American male writers
21st-century American non-fiction writers
American male non-fiction writers
American male screenwriters
American television writers
Film directors from Tennessee
American male television writers
People from Memphis, Tennessee
Screenwriters from Tennessee
21st-century American screenwriters